Lady in Danger was a play by Australian writer Max Afford.  It was one of the few Australian plays to enjoy a run on Broadway.  It was also adapted for radio and television.

Plot
Monica Sefton is the wife of a sacked reporter.  She plans to write a thriller to restore the family fortune.  She accidentally stumbles upon a Nazi spy ring.

Production history

1942 amateur production
The play was first produced by Doris Fitton at the Independent Theatre in Sydney in early 1942.

1944 professional production
The play was seen by representatives of J.C. Williamsons Ltd, the leading theatrical producers in the country, who bought the rights. Since Williamsons had not produced an Australian play in over 20 years this was seen as a positive step for Australian playwriting.

The play made its professional debut on 15 March 1944 at the Theatre Royal in Sydney and was positively received.

Afford said “The   season   at   the   Independent, gave   me   an   opportunity   to   improve   any   weaknesses.  Naturally,   the   professional   production   will   be   a   more   elaborate   one particularly   in   the   last   act,   which requires   sliding   panels   and   secret passages.” 

The play was published in 1944.

1945 Broadway production

The play was also optioned for production on Broadway, although it was rewritten by Alexander Kirkland to be set in Melbourne, Australia and be about a Japanese spy ring. The character of Bill Sefton was changed to  an American soldier who was stationed in Melbourne, and his wife Monica now grew up in Japan, not Germany. The other characters played Australians. Kirkland finished his new draft by September 1944. Robert Cummings and Jane Wyman were announced as possible stars.

Lady in Danger premiered in Detroit in March 1945.

Cast
 Ronald Alexander as Detective Dennis Marsh
 Gary Blivers as Frederick Smith
 Helen Claire as Monica Sefton
 Vicki Cummings as Sylvia Meade
 Clarence Derwent as Chief Inspector Burke
 Elfrida Derwent as Miss Hodges
 Paul Fairleigh as Karl Kurt
 Hudson Faussett as Constable Pogson

Response
Reviews were not strong and it closed after twelve performances.

The Cincinnati Enquirer said "there is not the tiniest suspicion of comedy throughout and the only mystery about the entire sorry affair is how in the name of things theatrical it was produced in the first place." Walter Winchell said "it had better have stayed down under." The Daily News called it "a tepid chiller."

"That's not: too good, is it?" said Afford. "Still, ¥ don't suppose you can hitthe jackpot eveir time."

1955 radio adaptation
The play was adapted for radio on the ABC in 1955.

1959 television version

The play was adapted for television on the ABC in the 1950s. Broadcast live in Sydney on 9 September 1959, a kinescope recording ("telerecording") was made of the broadcast and shown in Melbourne on 24 September 1959.

Cast included Madi Hedd, James Condon and Queenie Ashton. It is not known if the kinescope recording still exists.

Cast
 James Condon as Bill Sefton
 Madi Hedd as Monica Sefton
 Queenie Ashton as Mrs Lamprey
 Richard Parry as Dr Norton
 Alastair Duncan as Andy Meade
 Peter Carver as Detective Burke
 John Bluthal as Inspector Marsh
 James Elliott as Detective Pogson
 Kevin Williams
 Coralie Neville

Production
It was the first drama directed by Colin Dean at the ABC. He was assigned the job by ABC's Director of Drama, Neil Hutchinson. "It was a 'try-out' to see if I can do it," said Dean. "It wasn't a substantial play."

An especially trained cat was used for certain scenes.

Reception
The Age said it "provided an interesting hour's entertainment... outstanding feature was the fine sustained acting from Madi Hedd... James Condon... was not quite as convincing."

The Sydney Morning Herald called it a "neatly tailored thriller" which set "out to do nothing more ambitious than pass an entertaining hour" and "did just that and nothing more in a very competent live television production... [the cast] all played as though they had been doing this kind of thing for most of their working lives. Colin Dean's production aptly matched their efficiency and craftsmanship."

See also
List of live television plays broadcast on Australian Broadcasting Corporation (1950s)

References

External links
 Full text of play at Project Gutenberg
 
 
 
 
 
 
 
  (archive)
 Review of 1945 Broadway production at Variety

1942 plays
Australian plays
1959 television plays
Australian television plays
Australian Broadcasting Corporation original programming
English-language television shows
Black-and-white Australian television shows
Australian live television shows
1950s Australian television plays